The Rates Act 1984 is an Act of Parliament in the United Kingdom, which controls the tax-raising powers of local authorities.

Background

The Thatcher government had been at odds with several high spending Labour controlled councils. The Local Government Finance and Planning Act 1980 and the Local Government Finance Act 1982 allowed central government to decide spending limits for individual authorities. It could remove general grants, which accounted for approximately 60% of the councils’ income, if they continued to overspend. Several councils continued with their programmes of services and had their general grant cut under the earlier legislation. For example, by 1983, the Greater London Council (GLC) had lost all its central funding.

However, the GLC and other councils sought to recoup the loss by increasing the amount they levied in domestic and business rates; a tax paid by companies and homeowners.

Provisions

The Rates Act 1984 allowed the government to individually set caps for the increases to rates that each authority could levy. Those who acted ultra vires (or "beyond the powers") set out in the Act could be prosecuted, banned from office for up to ten years and fined. The power to control rates came into force for the year beginning 1 April 1985.

Use of the Act

The Act was successfully used to force 31 councils (30 were Labour controlled), who had initially resisted, to comply with government taxation and spending limits. Of those, only Lambeth and Liverpool councillors did not back down and eventually the Act was used to prosecute and fine the leader of Lambeth Council, Ted Knight, and others. He was banned from office for ten years.

Legacy

The domestic rates were replaced in 1990 by the Community Charge (dubbed poll tax), which was paid by more people and intended to reveal inefficient councils, who would be forced to levy a higher charge in order to fund their overspending.  Business rates are still levied, but at a level set by central government since 1990.

References

United Kingdom Acts of Parliament 1984